In mathematics, the scale convolution of two functions  and , also known as their logarithmic convolution is defined as the function

when this quantity exists.

Results

 

Logarithms